The E10 European long distance path or E10 path is one of the European long-distance paths, running from Finland through Germany, Czech Republic, Austria, Italy and France to finish at Nice on the south coast of France.

European Ramblers' Association doesn't take the responsibility for E10 in Finland, because of no ERA Member Organisation in this country.

E10 - map and information by the European Ramblers' Association
 The E10 in Outdoorwiki 

Hiking trails in Germany
Hiking trails in France
European long-distance paths